Geotextiles are permeable fabrics which, when used in association with soil, have the ability to separate, filter, reinforce, protect, or drain. Typically made from polypropylene or polyester, geotextile fabrics come in two basic forms: woven (resembling mail bag sacking) and nonwoven (resembling felt).

Geotextile composites have been introduced and products such as geogrids and meshes have been developed. Geotextiles are durable and are able to soften a fall. Overall, these materials are referred to as geosynthetics and each configuration—geonets, geosynthetic clay liners, geogrids, geotextile tubes, and others—can yield benefits in geotechnical and environmental engineering design.

History
Geotextiles were originally intended to be a substitute for granular soil filters.  The original, and still sometimes used, term for geotextiles is filter fabrics.  Work originally began in the 1950s with R.J. Barrett using geotextiles behind precast concrete seawalls, under precast concrete erosion control blocks, beneath large stone riprap, and in other erosion control situations.  He used different styles of woven monofilament fabrics, all characterized by a relatively high percentage open area (varying from 6 to 30%).  He discussed the need for both adequate permeability and soil retention, along with adequate fabric strength and proper elongation and set the tone for geotextile use in filtration situations.

Applications

Geotextiles and related products have many applications and currently support many civil engineering applications including roads, airfields, railroads, embankments, retaining structures, reservoirs, canals, dams, bank protection, coastal engineering and construction site silt fences or geotube. Usually geotextiles are placed at the tension surface to strengthen the soil. Geotextiles are also used for sand dune armoring to protect upland coastal property from storm surge, wave action and flooding. A large sand-filled container (SFC) within the dune system prevents storm erosion from proceeding beyond the SFC. Using a sloped unit rather than a single tube eliminates damaging scour.

Erosion control manuals comment on the effectiveness of sloped, stepped shapes in mitigating shoreline erosion damage from storms. Geotextile sand-filled units provide a "soft" armoring solution for upland property protection. Geotextiles are used as matting to stabilize flow in stream channels and swales.

Geotextiles can improve soil strength at a lower cost than conventional soil nailing. In addition, geotextiles allow planting on steep slopes, further securing the slope.

Geotextiles have been used to protect the fossil hominid footprints of Laetoli in Tanzania from erosion, rain, and tree roots.

In building demolition, geotextile fabrics in combination with steel wire fencing can contain explosive debris.

Coir (coconut fiber) geotextiles are popular for erosion control, slope stabilization and bioengineering, due to the fabric's substantial mechanical strength. Coir geotextiles last approximately 3 to 5 years depending on the fabric weight. The product degrades into humus, enriching the soil.

Global warming

Glacier retreat
Geotextiles with reflective properties are used in protecting the melting glaciers. In north Italy, they use Geotextiles to cover the glaciers for protecting from the Sun.

Design methods
While many possible design methods or combinations of methods are available to the geotextile designer, the ultimate decision for a particular application usually takes one of three directions: design by cost and availability, design by specification, or design by function.  Extensive literature on design methods for geotextiles has been published in the peer reviewed journal Geotextiles and Geomembranes.

Requirements

Geotextiles are needed for specific requirements, just as anything else in the world. Some of these requirements consist of polymers composed of a minimum of 85% by weight poly-propylene, polyesters, polyamides, polyolefins, and polyethylene.

See also
Hard landscape materials
Sediment control
Geomembrane
Polypropylene raffia

References

Further reading

 Koerner, R. M. (2012). Designing With Geosynthetics, 6th Edition, Xlibris Publishing Co., 914 pgs.
 Koerner, R. M., Editor (2016). Geotextiles: From Design to Applications, Woodhead Publishing Co., AMsterdam, 617 pgs.
 John, N. W. M. (1987). Geotextiles, Blackie Publishing Ltd., Glasgow, 347 pgs.

Textiles
Geosynthetics
Landscape architecture
Building materials
Plastics applications